Lunalithus is a monotypic genus of Phrurolithidae spiders, first described by Takahide Kamura in 2022. Its single species, Lunalithus luna is distributed in Japan.

References 

Phrurolithidae
Spiders of Asia
Phrurolithidae genera
Monotypic Araneomorphae genera